Tyreece Kennedy-Williams (born 8 January 2001) is an English footballer who currently plays for  side Redditch United, on loan from Notts County, where he plays as a defender.

Playing career

Notts County
Kennedy-Williams made his debut for Notts County on 9 October 2018 in an EFL Trophy fixture at home to Newcastle United which the away side won 2–0, Tyreece played the full match.

References

External links

2000 births
Living people
English footballers
Association football defenders
Notts County F.C. players
Redditch United F.C. players